This is a list of female Heroes of the Soviet Union; of the 12,777 people awarded the title, 95 were women, 49 of whom were posthumous recipients of the title.

Recipients

Soviet military personnel

Soviet partisans

Soviet cosmonauts

Foreign military personnel

Notes

References 
 Cottam, Kazimiera J.  Women in War and Resistance: Selected Biographies of Soviet Women Soldiers.  Newburyport, Mass.: Focus Publishing/R. Pullins Company, 1998.  .

Heroes of the Soviet Union lists
Lists of Soviet women